Sadayavarman Vikkiraman I  was king and Lord Emperor of the Pandya dynasty, ruling regions of Tamilakkam (present day South India between 1250–1268). Jatavarman Sundara Pandyan I is remembered for his patronage of the arts and  architecture, paying attention to the refurbishment and decoration of Kovils in the Tamil continent. He oversaw the massive economic growth of the Pandyan kingdom. On the eve of his death in 1268, the second Pandyan empire's power and territorial extent had risen to its zenith.

Unclear Regnal period 

His years of reign are unclear. While  N Sethuraman mentions him as the Pandyan ruler between 1241 and 1250, KA Nilakanta Sastri mentions Maravarman Sundara Pandyan II as the Pandyan prince defeated by Rajendra Chola III around 1250.

Hoysala influence
This period was marked with increasing Hoysala influence under the rule of Vira Someshwara. According to KA Nilakanta Sastri

Hoysala influence over the whole area of the Chola kingdom and even in the Pandya country increased steadily from about 1220 to 1245, a period which may  be well described as that of Hoysala hegemony in the south.

The Pandyan inscriptions of this period indicate tribute being paid to the Hoysala king

Notes

References

 
 
 

Pandyan kings
Tamil history
13th-century Hindus
Year of death unknown
Year of birth unknown